Rîșcani is a district in the north-west  of Moldova, with the administrative center at Rîșcani.
The other major city is Costești. As of 1 January 2011, its population was 70,000.

History
Near the town Costești there are traces of a town which belonged to the Golden Horde, but was abandoned in 1360. Cities with the oldest historical attestation are Horodiște, Recea Șaptebani being mentioned historical period from 1429–1437. In the following centuries district is develop economically and cultural. In 1812 after the Treaty of Bucharest, both Basarabia, and the district come under Russian occupation (1812–1918), this time the district is actively colonized with Ukrainian, Russian, Germans and Hebrew these nationalities formed their own villages. On 27 March 1918 expressing the will of the people, countries, by virtue of history and nation, decide by unanimous vote the Union of Bessarabia with Romania. Following the pact between Hitler and Stalin from June 26, 1940 the fate of Bessarabia was determined by military force. On 22 June 1941 include the start of 1418 days and nights of fierce and bloody fights between the Germans and Soviets. After the 2004 census the population of the district was 72,400 inhabitants.

Geography

Located in the north of Moldova, the district is nearby: Edinet and Donduseni districts in the north, the east Drochia and Singerei, in south Municipality Bălți and Glodeni in west is the border with Romania. District is located on the Northern Moldavian Plateau with little relief fractured and weak erogenous process. Chernozems occupy a large majority of the district. Natural resources within the district are represented by materials: limestone, clay, sand, gravel, which is near the villages Druta, Corlăteni, Braniște, Şaptebani. Maximum altitude in the district, is reached 280 m. near the village Pociumbeni.

Climate 
The district has a temperate-continental climate with an average annual temperature of 9-10 C. For July is an average temperature of 20–20.5 C and in January -4.5 -5 c. 400–550 mm annual rainfall. The average hunting speed 3–5 m \ s.

Fauna 
Fauna of the district is composed of mammals, birds, reptiles and others. In the forests there are: wild boars, deer, foxes, rabbits, badgers, various small rodents and birds such as nightingales, woodpeckers, hoopoes, sticletele, shots, and reptiles such as European green lizards, water snakes and vipers. Basins are populated by otters, muskrats, ducks, coots, divers, geese, swans, perch, bream, catfish, carp, crucian, saran, perch, gudgeon and others.

Flora 
Forests occupy 5.7% of the district, occupies an area even if a very small variety of plants, from trees: oak, common oak, linden, chestnut, cherry and others. Plants: fescue, clover, sedge, burdock and others.

Rivers 
Water District are part of the Black Sea. In the district flowing rivers Prut (river border with Romania), Ciuhur, Copăceanca, Racovăț, Pamernița, Camenca. In 1978 construction was completed hydraulic node "Costesti - Stanca '(common construction of the USSR and Romania) with capacity of 32 MGW. Surface water bodies, serving hydroelectric station is 59 km2 and volume of 1280 million m3 of water.

Protected areas 
Big rock - geological monument
Butesti keys
Duruitoarea gorge
Lucaceni nature reserve
Pociumbeni nature reserve
Reef Proscureni
Saptebani nature reserve
Stanca nature reserve
Varatic gorge

Administrative subdivisions
Localities: 55
Cities: Costesti, Rîșcani
Villages: 27
Commons: 26

Demographics
1 January 2012 the district population was 69,500 of which 22.7% urban and 77.3% rural population.

Births (2010): 760 (10.8 per 1000)
Deaths (2010): 1105 (15.7 per 1000)
Growth Rate (2010): -345 (-4.9 per 1000)

Ethnic groups 

Footnote: * There is an ongoing controversy regarding the ethnic identification of Moldovans and Romanians.

Religion 
Christians - 97.9%
Orthodox Christians - 96.3%
Protestant - 1.6%
Baptists - 0.7%
Pentecostals - 0.5%
Seventh-day Adventists - 0.4%
Other - 1.5%
No Religion - 0.4%
Atheists - 0.2%

Economy
A total of 15,300 working in the district of businesses. Agriculture is the branch of the district, occupying 81.8% of total land. The main crops are cereals (wheat, barley, oats), technical (sunflower, tobacco) and sugar beet, vegetables. Orchards (apple, cherry, plum) occupy 4.3%.

Education
Rîșcani district has 84 educational institutions, including:
Agro College, vocational school, 8 high schools, 6 middle schools, 25 secondary schools, 1 primary school, a school auxiliary, 1 sports school, a creative center and 39 kindergartens.

Politics
Rîșcani district is located in the region so-called North Red, PCRM here usually get good results, gathered from 2001 over 50% of the vote. But the last three elections the Communists are in constant decline.

During the last three elections AEI had an increase of 82.7%

Elections 

|-
!style="background-color:#E9E9E9" align=center colspan="2" valign=center|Parties and coalitions
!style="background-color:#E9E9E9" align=right|Votes
!style="background-color:#E9E9E9" align=right|%
!style="background-color:#E9E9E9" align=right|+/−
|-
| 
|align=left|Party of Communists of the Republic of Moldova
|align="right"|15,043
|align="right"|47.75
|align="right"|−3.34
|-
| 
|align=left|Liberal Democratic Party of Moldova
|align="right"|7,307
|align="right"|23.19
|align="right"|+9.83
|-
| 
|align=left|Democratic Party of Moldova
|align="right"|4,494
|align="right"|14,27
|align="right"|-1.83
|-
| 
|align=left|Liberal Party
|align="right"|1,842
|align="right"|5.85
|align="right"|−3.02
|-
| 
|align=left|Party Alliance Our Moldova
|align="right"|807
|align="right"|2.57
|align="right"|−3.94
|-
|bgcolor=#0033cc|
|align=left|European Action Movement 
|align="right"|517
|align="right"|1.64
|align="right"|+1.64
|-
|bgcolor="grey"|
|align=left|Humanist Party of Moldova 
|align="right"|402
|align="right"|1.28
|align="right"|+1.28
|-
|bgcolor="grey"|
|align=left|Other Party
|align="right"|1098
|align="right"|3.46
|align="right"|-0.61
|-
|align=left style="background-color:#E9E9E9" colspan="2"|Total (turnout 58.62%)
|width="30" align="right" style="background-color:#E9E9E9"|31,754
|width="30" align="right" style="background-color:#E9E9E9"|100.00
|width="30" align="right" style="background-color:#E9E9E9"|

Culture
The district Riscani operates: 96 cultural institutions, including houses of culture - 6, Clubs - 37, Libraries - 52, Museums - 1. 160 Enable artistic, 19 hold the title of the band model.

Health
The district operates:
A district hospital with 250 beds, general fund a center of family doctors in the composition of which includes 18 offices of family physicians, 8 health centers, 20 health points.

Personalities
Alexandru Mosanu - Politician, historian and professor, President of the Parliament of Moldova in 1990-1993
Anatol Şalaru - Minister of Transport and Road Infrastructure of Moldova from 2009, Vice-President of the Liberal Party of 2008
Eugenio Coşeriu - Romance philologist, honorary member of the Romanian Academy, from 1963 and by the end of life was a professor at Tübingen (Germany)
Gherman Pântea - Politician, Mayor of Chisinau 1923, 1927–1928, 1932, Mayor of Odessa 1941-1944
Liviu Damian - Poet and essayist
Victor Catan - Minister of Internal Affairs of the Republic of Moldova in 2009-2011

References

 
Districts of Moldova